MyLifeBits is a life-logging experiment begun in 2001. It is a Microsoft Research project inspired by Vannevar Bush's hypothetical Memex computer system. The project includes full-text search, text and audio annotations, and hyperlinks.  The "experimental subject" of the project is computer scientist Gordon Bell, and the project will try to collect a lifetime of storage on and about Bell.  Jim Gemmell of Microsoft Research and Roger Lueder were the architects and creators of the system and its software.

MyLifeBits is an attempt to fulfill Vannevar Bush's vision of an automated store of the documents, pictures (including those taken automatically), and sounds an individual has experienced in his lifetime, to be accessed with speed and ease. For this, Bell has digitized all documents he has read or produced, CDs, emails, and so on. He continues to do so, gathering web pages browsed, phone and instant messaging conversations and the like more or less automatically. The book Total Recall describes the vision and implications for a personal, lifetime e-memory for recall, work, health, education, and immortality.
In 2010, Total Recall was published in paperback. , Bell was no longer using the wearable camera associated with the project. He described the rise of the smartphone as largely fulfilling Bush's vision of the Memex.

See also 
 Dymaxion Chronofile
 Lifelog
 Microsoft SenseCam

References

External links 
 MyLifeBits Project
 Gordon Bell and Jim Gemmell – A look into Microsoft's Bay Area Research Center, Part I Channel9 video, including MyLifeBits material.
 Flogging Gordon Bell's Memory Thinking about how lifelogs, or flogs, would fundamentally change psychotherapy and psychiatry.
 "A Head For Detail" Clive Thompson, Fast Company

Microsoft Research